Quadrax is a Slovak video game series of freeware games by Cauldron, commencing with Quadrax in 1995.

Production
The debut game was one of the first commercially sold logic games distributed in Slovakia. It was a remake of the 1994 game created by programmers David Durčák and Marian Ferko for ZX Spectrum. The duo would found Cauldron the following year.

Despite the success of the first game, there wasn't an official sequel by Cauldron. In 1997 Alfaline would create an unofficial and unpublished sequel. Meanwhile, Quadrax III would become the first public successor in 2000. The fourth game was released in 2008.

Reception
Bonusweb.cz felt that Quadrax belonged in the tradition of puzzle games alongside The Humans and Lemmings. The site described 2006's Faux pa as a clone of this title. Doupe.cz thought the game was excellent.

Bonusweb.cz said Quadrax IV is a cool project and that it does not disappoint.

Bonusweb.cz said that Quadrax VIII is the most difficult game of all time.

Bonusweb.cz felt that Quadrax X raised the bar of difficulty from the previous entries.

References

1995 video games
DOS games
Puzzle video games
Video games developed in Slovakia
ZX Spectrum games